Giorgio Scerbanenco (18 July  1911 –  27 October 1969) was a Ukrainian-born Italian crime fiction writer.

Life and works 
Giorgio Scerbanenco was born in Kyiv, in what was then the Russian Empire. At an early age, his family immigrated to Rome (Scerbanenco's father was Ukrainian, his mother was Italian), and then he moved to Milan when he was 18 years old.

He found work as a freelance writer for many Italian magazines, chief among them Annabella before becoming a novelist. His first fiction books were detective novels set in the United States and clearly inspired by the works of Edgar Wallace and S.S. Van Dine signed with an English-sounding pen name. While Scerbanenco wrote in several genres, he is famous in Italy for his crime and detective novels, many of which have been dramatized in Italian film and television . These include the series of novels with main character Duca Lamberti, a physician struck off the register for having performed a euthanasia, and turned detective (Venere privata - A Private Venus, 1966; Traditori di tutti - Betrayers of All, 1966; I ragazzi del massacro - The Boys of the Massacre, 1968; I milanesi ammazzano al sabato - The Milanese kill on Saturday, 1969), as well as Sei giorni di preavviso (Six Days of Notice), his first novel. He died of a heart attack in Milan on 27 October 1969. As well as in Milan, the writer lived for a long period in Lignano Sabbiadoro, a town on the Adriatic Sea in Friuli-Venezia Giulia. The town holds his archive.

Style 
Scerbanenco was a frail, shy man, and his style was notable for the realistic way in which conveyed and evoked the helplessness and despair of weak people being cruelly victimized.

His depiction of female characters is based on his years of experience answering the letters of women magazines' readers.

His virulent and over-the-top anti-communism stemmed from the trauma of losing his father during the Russian revolution, the trauma of exile and the meager life in Rome which followed it.

This odd trait helped his popularity among Italian low and middle bourgeoisie, who felt reinforced in their social prejudices, but hampered his critical success in Italy; international critics (especially in France) did overlook this facet of his style and praised him when at home he was considered nothing more than a genre writer.

His writing, in the best known books, is Milanocentric, seldom if ever referencing other cities and regions of Italy, showing a degree of sympathy and appreciation for the Lombard city and its inhabitants which is rarely to be found in other writers. While denouncing the evils of the rampant consumeristic and greedy way of life taking hold from the 60s onward Scerbanenco always has a warm word for the peaceful, quiet, hard-working Milanese.

Honours 
Asteroid 49441 Scerbanenco, discovered by astronomers at the San Vittore Observatory in 1998, was named in his memory. The official naming citation was published by the Minor Planet Center on 31 March 2018.

Bibliography

Film and television adaptations 
 Naked Violence (I ragazzi del massacro), directed by Fernando Di Leo (1969)
 Safety Catch (Cran d'arrêt), directed by Yves Boisset (1970)
 La morte risale a ieri sera, directed by Duccio Tessari (1970)
 Caliber 9 (Milano calibro 9), directed by Fernando Di Leo (1972)
 The Italian Connection (La mala ordina), directed by Fernando Di Leo (1972)
 The Killer Must Kill Again (L'assassino è costretto ad uccidere ancora), directed by Luigi Cozzi (1975)
 Young, Violent, Dangerous (Liberi armati pericolosi), directed by Romolo Guerrieri (1976)
 Quattro delitti (TV film), directed by Alberto Siron, Gian Pietro Calasso and Vittorio Melloni (1979)
 La ragazza dell'addio (TV film), directed by Daniele D'Anza (1984)
 Appuntamento a Trieste (TV miniseries), directed by Bruno Mattei (1989)
 L'uomo che non voleva morire (TV film), directed by Lamberto Bava (1989)
 ¡Dispara!, directed by Carlos Saura (1993)
 Occhio di falco - serie TV serial, directed by Vittorio De Sisti (1996)

References 
 

1911 births
1969 deaths
Writers from Kyiv
Italian crime fiction writers
Ukrainian people in the Russian Empire
20th-century Italian novelists
20th-century Italian male writers
Italian male novelists
Emigrants from the Russian Empire to Italy
Ukrainian people of Italian descent
People from the Russian Empire of Italian descent